Anematichthys repasson is a species of freshwater fish in the family Cyprinidae. It lives in Southeast Asia. Specifically, it occurs in the Mekong and Chao Phraya basins, Malay Peninsula, Sumatra, Java, and Borneo. It grows to  SL. It is a minor commercial fishery species that lives in rivers, canals, ponds and reservoirs.

References 

Fish of Southeast Asia
Cyprinid fish of Asia
Fish of the Mekong Basin
Fish of Cambodia
Freshwater fish of Indonesia
Fish of Laos
Freshwater fish of Malaysia
Fish of Myanmar
Fish of Thailand
Fish of Vietnam
Freshwater fish of Borneo
Freshwater fish of Java
Freshwater fish of Sumatra
Fish described in 1853
Taxa named by Pieter Bleeker
Taxobox binomials not recognized by IUCN